Live Animals is the sixth live album by English punk rock band the Anti-Nowhere League. It contains tracks recorded at various times at various shows, but all have either appeared on Live In Yugoslavia or Live and Loud.

Track listing
Animal
Lets Break The Law
Streets of London (McTell)
For You
Can't Stand Rock ‘n’ Roll
We Will Survive
Going Down
Let The Country Feed You
Queen And Country
Johannesburg 
Crime
Branded
Something Else
On The Waterfront
So What!
Snowman
Fuck Around The Clock

References

External links

Anti-Nowhere League albums
2002 live albums